UN numbers from UN1901 to UN2000 as assigned by the United Nations Committee of Experts on the Transport of Dangerous Goods are as follows:


UN 1901 to UN 2000 

n.o.s. = not otherwise specified meaning a collective entry to which substances, mixtures, solutions or articles may be assigned if a) they are not mentioned by name in 3.2 Dangerous Goods List AND b) they exhibit chemical, physical and/or dangerous properties corresponding to the Class, classification code, packing group and the name and description of the n.o.s.entry

See also 
Lists of UN numbers

References

External links
ADR Dangerous Goods, cited on 26 April 2015.
UN Dangerous Goods List from 2015, cited on 26 April 2015.
UN Dangerous Goods List from 2013, cited on 26 April 2015.

Lists of UN numbers